Loch Bad a' Ghaill is a small remote and deep freshwater loch that is located 10 miles north of Ullapool and immediately north west of Loch Lurgainn. It is located in the Coigach peninsula in Lochbroom, Wester Ross.  The scenic qualities of Coigach, along with neighbouring Assynt, have led to the area being designated as the Assynt-Coigach National Scenic Area, one of 40 such areas in Scotland. The main settlement in the area, located directly to the north-west is Achiltibuie.

References

Freshwater lochs of Scotland
Lochs of Ross and Cromarty
Garvie Basin